The Bois Locker Room controversy refers to the investigation of an Instagram group chat started by a group of schoolboys and schoolgirls from Delhi, India in 2020. The group chat's purpose was to share obscene images of women, many of them underage, which lead to public outcry.

Background 
Members of the group are said to be 11th and 12th grade students in some of Delhi's top schools. They posted photos of teenage girls without their consent, along with offensive comments, including mentions of gang rape. This sparked debates and controversy about the existence of rape culture in schools. According to social media accounts that posted leaked screenshots from the group, members of "Bois Locker Room" threatened to leak nude photographs of the women who reported them.

In May 2020, the Delhi Commission for Women condemned the group and the cyber unit of the Delhi Police initiated a probe of its participants.

Investigation by Delhi Police 
Despite lockdowns in place in Delhi for COVID-19, the investigation was expedited, reportedly with help from Swati Maliwal, Chairwoman of the Delhi Commission for Women. By 6 May 2020, fifteen students were questioned and one arrested. The police identified many of the 27 participants as underage.

As of 11 May 2020, the police had arrested the administrator of "Bois Locker Room" in Noida, India apprehended another juvenile who was in the group, and confiscated the mobile phones of all the suspects. Of the 27 boys, 24 had been examined, two were out of reach and the details of one were pending.

Manav Singh's suicide 
Twelfth grade student Manav Singh was accused of sexual assault by a friend via social media and committed suicide the day before the Bois Locker Room screenshots surfaced on the internet, leading many to believe that they were related. Rishi Singh, Manav Singh's brother, took to Instagram to claim that his brother was innocent and mention that the circumstances that compelled his brother to take such "drastic" steps were not related to the conversations in the Bois Locker Room chat.

Siddharth rumor 
On 10 May 2020, Saurabh Trivedi, a journalist from the newspaper The Hindu reported in a thread on Twitter that a girl using "the fake identity of a male person" and the name "Siddharth" suggested a plan to sexually assault herself in a group chat on Snapchat. Trivedi wrote, "The purpose of her sending such chat messages using a fake, fictional identity was to check the reaction of the receiver boy and the strength of his character," and that the police would take no action against the girl, who they considered a juvenile committing "a childish act". The chat in question was initially believed to be a conversation among boys who were a part of the Bois Locker Room group, but this was later disproven. Police also reported that they had identified all 27 members and admins of the Instagram chat group as male.

References 

Scandals in India
2020 crimes in India
Sexism in India
Cybercrime in India
Instagram
Education scandals
Secondary education in India
2020s in Delhi
Sex crimes in India